Renato Anselmo Rivera Rico (born June 17, 1985 in Guadalajara, Jalisco) is a former professional Mexican footballer.

References

1985 births
Living people
Association football forwards
C.D. Guadalajara footballers
Dorados de Sinaloa footballers
Club León footballers
Leones Negros UdeG footballers
Liga MX players
Ascenso MX players
Footballers from Guadalajara, Jalisco
Mexican footballers